The 2022–23 Liga 2 is the sixth season of the Liga 2 under its current name and the 13th season under its current league structure. The league is participated by 28 teams, an increase of four teams from the previous season's campaign.

The tournament, along with Liga 3 was abandoned due to a combination of factors.

Teams

Team changes
The following teams changed division after the 2021 season.

Name changes
 AHHA PS Pati relocated to Bekasi and were renamed to Bekasi FC However, following a lawsuit by Bekasi FC's original rights holder, the club is subject to another name change, which will be decided in the near future. On 30 May 2022, during the 2022 PSSI Ordinary Congress, the club finally changed their name once again to Bekasi City.
Mataram Utama handed over their senior team to a group of investors, who subsequently rebranded the club as Nusantara United. The two clubs exist as separate entities, with Nusantara United taking over Mataram Utama's place in the Liga 2, while Mataram Utama redirected their focus towards youth development and their football academy. On 5 July, Nusantara United, on an Instagram post unveiling their new logo, revealed that they are now based in Nusantara, the planned new capital of Indonesia.
Muba Babel United was acquired by Liga 3 side Persipal Palu. As a result, Persipal took over Muba Babel United's place in Liga 2 starting from the 2022–23 season and they will compete under name Persipal BU.

Stadiums and locations

Notes:

Personnel and kits
Note: Flags indicate national team as has been defined under FIFA eligibility rules. Players and coaches may hold more than one non-FIFA nationality.

Notes:

 On the front of shirt.
 On the back of shirt.
 On the sleeves.
 On the shorts.
 Apparel made by club.

Coaching changes

First round

West Region

Central Region

East Region

Ranking possible relegation 

Since the Central Region contains 10 teams, the results against the 10th place do not count.

Second round
In this round, competing teams will be divided into two groups of three teams (groups X to Y). Teams in each group played one another in a double round-robin.

Group X

Group Y

Knockout round

Season statistics

Top goalscorers

Discipline 

 Most yellow card(s): 4
  Yericho Christiantoko (Persekat)
 Most red card(s): 1
  Marcel Yusuf Usemahu (Deltras)
  Sandy Ferizal (Persela)
  Sugiyanto (Perserang)
  Imanuel Rumbiak (Persewar)
  Andre Putra Wibowo (Persijap)
  Munhar (PSPS)
  Patrison Lucky Rumere (PSBS)
  Susanto (Perserang)
  Ahmad Amin Agusti (PSKC)
  Ahmad Burhan Afiludin (Persikab)

Hat-tricks

Attendances

See also
 2022–23 Liga 1
 2022–23 Liga 3
 2022–23 Piala Indonesia

References

Second tier Indonesian football league seasons
Liga 2
Indonesia
Liga 2
Liga 2
Liga 2